Eupithecia haywardi is a moth in the family Geometridae described by David Stephen Fletcher in 1953. It is found in Argentina.

References

Moths described in 1953
haywardi
Moths of South America